The group stage of the 2019 Sudirman Cup was the first stage of the competition. It was held at Guangxi Sports Center in Nanning, China, from 19 to 22 May. For Group 1, the top two teams from each group (8 in total) advanced to the final knockout stage to compete in a single-elimination tournament. Teams from group 2 and 3 (16 in total) play round robin in respective subgroup and advanced to classification round to determine the overall placings, meanwhile teams from group 4 play in a single round robin format for final placings.

Seeding
The seeding for 32 teams competing in the tournament were announced on 12 March 2019. It was based on aggregated points from the best players in the world ranking as of 5 March 2019. The tournament was divided into four groups, with twelve teams in the elite group competing for the title. Eight teams were seeded into second and third groups and four remaining teams were seeded into fourth group.

On the day of the draw, it was announced that the original list of 32 teams was pared down to 31, with Kenya withdrawing from the tournament. The 31 participating teams were divided into four groups, with Group 1 consisting of the 12 teams that will compete for the title. Group 2 and Group 3 (eight teams each) along with Group 4 (three teams) will fight for overall placings. The draw was held on 19 March 2019.

Group composition

Group 1A

Japan vs Russia

Thailand vs Russia

Japan vs Thailand

Group 1B

Indonesia vs England

Denmark vs England

Indonesia vs Denmark

Group 1C

Chinese Taipei vs Hong Kong

South Korea vs Hong Kong

Chinese Taipei vs South Korea

Group 1D

China vs Malaysia

India vs Malaysia

China vs India

Group 2A

Netherlands vs Vietnam

France vs United States

France vs Vietnam

Netherlands vs United States

United States vs Vietnam

Netherlands vs France

Group 2B

Canada vs Singapore

Germany vs Israel

Germany vs Singapore

Canada vs Israel

Germany vs Canada

Singapore vs Israel

Group 3A

Ireland vs Nepal

Australia vs New Zealand

Australia vs Nepal

Ireland vs New Zealand

Ireland vs Australia

New Zealand vs Nepal

Group 3B

Switzerland vs Lithuania

Sri Lanka vs Slovakia

Sri Lanka vs Lithuania

Switzerland vs Slovakia

Switzerland vs Sri Lanka

Slovakia vs Lithuania

Group 4

Macau vs Greenland

Kazakhstan vs Greenland

Macau vs Kazakhstan

References

External links
 

Sudirman Cup
2019 Sudirman Cup
Sudirman Cup group stage